The National Hostosian Congress (CNH) was a small left-wing and pro-independence organization in Puerto Rico. Led by Héctor L. Pesquera, many of its members were formerly involved in the Puerto Rican Socialist Party. In 2004, the CNH joined with the New Puerto Rican Independence Movement to form the Hostosian National Independence Movement (MINH).

External links
 Official web site

Political advocacy groups in Puerto Rico